The 2014 Fórmula 3 Brasil season was the eighth Fórmula 3 Brasil season and the first since 1995, replacing the Formula 3 Sudamericana series as the highest-profile single-seater championship on the continent.

The championship was dominated by Pedro Piquet, the son of three-time Formula One world champion Nelson Piquet, winning 12 of the 16 races – 11 overall wins, plus a class win at Santa Cruz do Sul – that were held during the season. Driving for the Cesário F3 team, Piquet finished nearly 100 points clear of his closest championship rival, Lukas Moraes. Moraes failed to finish each of the first three races during the season, but recovered to fend off Bruno Etman for the runner-up position, by just a single point. Moraes was also a race winner, taking a victory at Interlagos. The only other Class A driver to take a race victory was Renan Guerra, who won the second race at Interlagos, in a one-off appearance in the class, before moving to Class B for the remainder of the season.

Just like in the main class, one driver dominated in Class B. Piquet's Cesário F3 team-mate Vitor Baptista achieved 13 class victories from a possible 16, and took a trio of overall wins in the process, at Santa Cruz do Sul, Velopark and Curitiba respectively. Like Piquet, Baptista finished nearly 100 points clear of his closest championship rival, Matheus Leist. Leist won the class at Velopark and Goiânia, having joined the Césario team mid-season after commencing the campaign with Hitech Racing. Third place in class went to the only other race winner, Matheus Iorio of Hitech Racing, who won the final race of the season at Goiânia, to overhaul Victor Miranda in the points standings; it was the only race in the class not won by Césario. With commanding title wins for their drivers, Cesário F3 won both teams' championship titles by a large margin.

Drivers and teams
 All cars were powered by Berta engines, and ran on Pirelli tyres.

Race calendar and results

A calendar for the 2014 season was released on 12 December 2013, with the category supporting Brasileiro de Marcas at seven of the season's eight rounds, with the exception being Santa Cruz do Sul, with that round supporting Stock Car Brasil. All races were held in Brazil.

Notes

Championship standings
Points were awarded as follows:

Drivers' Championships

Teams' Championships

References

External links
 

Formula 3 Brasil
Brasil
Brazilian Formula Three Championship
Brasil F3